Eric Stuer (April, 1953 in Stamford CT USA – June 6, 2008) was an American percussionist.

Stuer was exposed to a wide variety of music and art at an early age by his family, who enjoyed an active artistic lifestyle in the New York City area. He moved with his parents to Houston in 1957, and began formal study of percussion in 1962, first with big band drummer Jack Dudney and after several years from Houston Symphony Orchestra percussionist "Hap" Fulghum. His professional career began in 1968 at the age of 15, with a series of fashion shows for Sakowitz department stores and a string of casual engagements in the Houston area.

His musical studies have continued with various teachers and from various other sources. Since the early 1970s he was based in the Dallas–Fort Worth metroplex, and specialized in various styles of drumset performance, along with a variety of hand drums and ethnic percussion, including homemade and found objects. Eric had experience arranging and composing, and was webmaster of Rhythmweb, an online resource for those researching rhythm and world percussion.

He and his wife, Deborah A. Longoria-Stuer, were killed in a car accident at 6:55 p.m. on June 6 of 2008.

References

External links 
Rhythmweb

1953 births
2008 deaths